Mary Bonaparte (Mary Léonie Eugénie Mathilde Jeanne Julie Zénaïde Bonaparte; 10 December 1870 – 1947) was the eldest surviving daughter of Prince Napoléon Bonaparte of Canino and Christine Ruspoli. On 25 November 1891 in Rome she married Enrico Gotti. They had no children.

Ancestry

References 

1870 births
1947 deaths
Mary Bonaparte
Mary Bonaparte